The 1991 SMU Mustangs football team represented Southern Methodist University (SMU) as a member of the Southwest Conference (SWC) during the 1991 NCAA Division I-A football season. Led by first-year head coach Tom Rossley, the Mustangs compiled an overall record of 1–10 with a mark of 0–8 in conference play, placing last out of nine teams in the SWC.

Schedule

Roster

References

SMU
SMU Mustangs football seasons
SMU Mustangs football